Martina Šefčíková (born 1 June 1971) is a Czech rower. She competed in the women's eight event at the 1992 Summer Olympics.

References

External links
 

1971 births
Living people
Czech female rowers
Olympic rowers of Czechoslovakia
Rowers at the 1992 Summer Olympics
People from Jindřichův Hradec
Sportspeople from the South Bohemian Region